Al-Haqlaniyah (Arabic: الحقلانية, al-Ḥaqlānīyah) is an Iraqi town on the Euphrates River in Al-Anbar province.

Populated places in Al Anbar Governorate
Populated places on the Euphrates River